Subversion is an attempt to overthrow structures of authority.

Subversion may also refer to:

 Psychological subversion, a method of verbally manipulating people for information
 Subversion and containment, a concept in literary studies
 Apache Subversion, a software versioning and revision control system
 Subversion (song), a 1996 gothic metal song
 Subversion (video game), a postponed computer game from Introversion Software